The United Kingdom of Great Britain and Northern Ireland competed as Great Britain at the 2002 Winter Olympics in Salt Lake City, United States.

Medallists

Alain Baxter came third in the Men's slalom but was subsequently disqualified for use of a stimulant. Baxter's claim that a mix up in the ingredients of the same branded cold medication between the UK and the US was the cause of the ingestion of the stimulant was accepted, and as a result he received the minimum ban of 3 months.

Alpine skiing

Men

Men's combined

Women

Women's combined

Biathlon

Men

Men's 4 × 7.5 km relay

 1 A penalty loop of 150 metres had to be skied per missed target. 
 3 One minute added per missed target.

Bobsleigh

Men

Women

Curling

Men's tournament

Group stage
Top four teams advanced to semi-finals.

|}

Contestants

* Hammy McMillan was replaced by Warwick Smith as skip after Draw 4.

Women's tournament

Group stage
Top four teams advanced to semi-finals.

|}

Tie-breaker 1

|}

Tie-breaker 2

|}

Medal round
Semi-final

Gold medal game

Contestants

Figure skating

Ice Dancing

Freestyle skiing

Men

Women

Luge

Men

Short track speed skating

Men

Women

Skeleton

Men

Women

Ski jumping

Snowboarding

Women's halfpipe

References

Official Olympic Reports 
International Olympic Committee results database
 Olympic Winter Games 2002, full results by sports-reference.com

Nations at the 2002 Winter Olympics
2002
Winter Olympics
Winter sports in the United Kingdom